Pulapre Balakrishnan ( Malayalam: പുലപ്രെ  ബാലകൃഷ്ണൻ ) is an Indian economist and educationalist. He has served as the director of   Centre for Development Studies and Professor at Indian Institute of Management Kozhikode. Pulapre Balakrishnan was born in his ancestral village of Klari, Malappuram, Kerala in 1955. He was educated in Moscow, Madras and New Delhi, and trained as an economist at Oxford and Cambridge Universities.

Pulapre has written in the professional journals and is the author of the books ‘Pricing and Inflation in India’ (OUP India, 1991), ‘Economic Growth in India: History and Prospect’ (OUP India, 2010) and 'Politics Trumps Economics' along with Bimal Jalan. Balakrishnan has held appointments at Worcester College Oxford, the Indian Statistical Institute at Delhi and the Indian Institute of Management at Kozhikode. He has served as Country Economist for Ukraine at the World Bank and been consultant to the International Labour Organisation, the Reserve Bank of India and the United Nations Development Program. He has for over two decades intervened in the public debate on India's economy via his popular writings. He is the recipient of the Malcolm Adiseshiah Award for Distinguished Contribution to Development Studies (2014).

He is currently Professor of Economics at Ashoka University  in Haryana.

References

External links
 Personal website

1955 births
20th-century Indian economists
Indian development economists
People from Malappuram
Living people